A tablespoon (tbsp. , Tbsp. , Tb. , or T.) is a large spoon. In many English-speaking regions, the term now refers to a large spoon used for serving; however, in some regions, it is the largest type of spoon used for eating.

By extension, the term is also used as a cooking measure of volume. In this capacity, it is most commonly abbreviated tbsp. or Tbsp. and occasionally referred to as a tablespoonful to distinguish it from the utensil. The capacity of the utensil (as opposed to the measurement) is defined by neither law nor custom but only by preferences, and may or may not significantly approximate the measurement.

Dining 
Before about 1700, it was customary for Europeans to bring their own spoons to the table. Spoons were carried as personal property in much the same way as people today carry wallets, key rings, etc. From about 1700 the place setting became popular, and with it the "table-spoon" (hyphenated), "table-fork" and "table-knife". Around the same time the tea-spoon and dessert-spoon first appeared, and the table-spoon was reserved for eating soup. The 18th century witnessed a proliferation of different sorts of spoons, including the mustard-spoon, salt-spoon, coffee-spoon, and soup-spoon.

In the late 19th century UK, the dessert-spoon and soup-spoon began to displace the table-spoon as the primary implement for eating from a bowl, at which point the name "table-spoon" took on a secondary meaning as a much larger serving spoon. At the time the first edition of the Oxford English Dictionary was published in 1928, "tablespoon" (which by then was no longer hyphenated) still had two definitions in the UK: the original definition (eating spoon) and the new definition (serving spoon).

Victorian and Edwardian era tablespoons used in the UK are often  or sometimes larger.  They are used only for preparing and serving food, not as part of a place-setting. Common tablespoons intended for use as cutlery (called dessert spoons in the UK, where a tablespoon is always a serving spoon) usually hold , considerably less than some tablespoons used for serving.

Culinary measure

Naming
In recipes, an abbreviation like tbsp. is usually used to refer to a tablespoon, to differentiate it from the smaller teaspoon (tsp.).  Some authors additionally capitalize the abbreviation, as  Tbsp., while leaving tsp. in lower case, to emphasize that the larger tablespoon, rather than the smaller teaspoon, is wanted. The tablespoon abbreviation is sometimes further abbreviated to Tb. or T.

Relationship to teaspoon and fluid ounce

Traditional definitions

International

United States
The traditional U.S. interpretation of the tablespoon as a unit of volume is:

{|
|-
|1 US tablespoon ||= 4 fluid drams
|-
|||= 3 teaspoons
|-
|||=  US fluid ounce
|-
|||≈ 14.8 ml
|}

Australia
The Australian definition of the tablespoon as a unit of volume is:

{|
|-
|1 Australian tablespoon ||colspan=3| = 20 ml
|-
| ||colspan=3| ≈  fl oz
|-
| || = 2 dessertspoons, ||style="text-align:right;"|     1 dessertspoon = || 10 ml each 
|-
| || = 4 teaspoons,  ||style="text-align:right;"| 1 teaspoon = ||   5 ml each 
|}

Dry measure

For dry ingredients, if a recipe calls for a level tablespoon, the usual meaning without further qualification, is measured by filling the spoon and scraping it level. In contrast, a heaped, heaping, or rounded spoonful is not leveled off, and includes a heap above the spoon. The exact volume of a heaped tablespoon depends somewhat on the shape and curvature of the measuring spoon being used and largely upon the physical properties of the substance being measured, and so is not a precise unit of measurement. If neither a rounded nor a level tablespoon is specified, a level tablespoon is used, just as a cup of flour is a level cup unless otherwise specified.

Apothecary measure
In the 18th century, the table-spoon became an unofficial unit of the apothecaries' system of measures, equal to 4 drams ( fl oz, 14.8 ml). It was more commonly known by the Latin name cochleare majus (abbreviated cochl. maj.) or, in apothecaries' notation, f℥ss or f℥ß.

See also

 Dessert spoon
 Teaspoon

References

Cooking weights and measures
Units of volume
Spoons
Customary units of measurement in the United States
Imperial units
Metricated units
Alcohol measurement